Burmabrithes is a genus of flies in the family Stratiomyidae.

Distribution
Myanmar.

Species
Burmabrithes annulipes Lindner, 1937

References

Stratiomyidae
Brachycera genera
Taxa named by Erwin Lindner
Diptera of Asia
Endemic fauna of Myanmar